Stenorhopalus valdiviensis is a species of beetle in the family Cerambycidae. It was described by Cerda in 1995.

References

Beetles described in 1995
Necydalinae